was the thirty-second of the sixty-nine stations of the Nakasendō. It is located in the central part of the present-day city of Shiojiri, Nagano Prefecture, Japan.

History
Motoyama became a post town in 1614, when the Nakasendō's route was changed. It became a post town at the same time as Shiojiri-juku and Seba-juku. It became known throughout the country for its soba noodles.

Neighboring post towns
Nakasendō
Seba-juku - Motoyama-juku - Niekawa-juku

References

Stations of the Nakasendō
Stations of the Nakasendo in Nagano Prefecture